The Department of Industry and Commerce was an Australian government department that existed between December 1975 and May 1982.

Scope
Information about the department's functions and/or government funding allocation could be found in the Administrative Arrangements Orders, the annual Portfolio Budget Statements and in the Department's annual reports.

At its creation, the Department dealt with:
The efficiency and development of manufacturing and tertiary industries and research relating thereto
Adjustment assistance to industry
Assistance to small business
Manufacture of goods and provision of services
Shipbuilding

Structure
The Department was an Australian Public Service department, staffed by officials who were responsible to the Minister for Industry and Commerce.

References

Industry and Commerce